Cristo Foufas is a radio presenter currently working for Talkradio.  He has previously worked for LBC and ITV.

Personal life
He has previously spoken about his relationship with his weight. He is gay.

References

British LGBT broadcasters
British talk radio presenters
Year of birth missing (living people)
Living people
21st-century LGBT people